Eduardo Reguera Andreu (13 October 1891 – 20 December 1977) was a Spanish footballer who played as a defender for FC Espanya and FC Barcelona. Reguera was one of the most important footballers in the amateur beginnings of FC Espanya, being a pivotal piece in turning FC Espanya into an important team in Catalonia.

Club career
Born in Barcelona, he began his career in 1910 at his hometown club FC Espanya de Barcelona, where he formed a great defensive partnership with Hermenegild Casellas. Unlike most teams, whose sources of power is either the attack or the midfield, FC Espanya's biggest strength was this back-line, which was the fundamental piece behind the team's rise in Catalonia, competing head-to-head against the likes of Barcelona and Espanyol, and winning two back-to-back Catalan championships in 1912-13 and 1913-14, thus qualifying to the Copa del Rey in which he helped the club reach the 1914 Copa del Rey Final, which still stands as the only cup final of the club's history, but Reguera missed it due to injury and without him, FC Espanya were beaten 1-2 by Athletic Bilbao.

His great defensive performances eventually drew the attention of FC Barcelona, who signed him in 1914. At Barça, he teamed up with goalkeeper Luis Bru, and helped the club win three Catalan championships (1915–16, 1918–19 and 1919–20) and to reach the 1919 Copa del Rey Final, in which his defense conceded 5 goals in a 2–5 loss to Arenas Club. This humiliation caused him to lose his place in the starting line-up, and so, on 19 October 1919, he was the subject of a tribute match along with Luis Bru, which took place at the Camp de la Indústria between Barça and FC Espanya, ending in a 2–2 draw.

International career
Like many other FC Barcelona players of that time, Reguera played a few matches for the Catalan national team in 1915, netting one goal in a 2–2 draw with Basque Country on 7 February 1915. Reguera was a member of the side that participated in the first edition of the Prince of Asturias Cup, an inter-regional competition organized by the RFEF.

Honours

Club
FC Espanya
Catalan championship:
Champions (1): 1912–13 and 1913–14

Pyrenees Cup:
Champions (1): 1914

Copa del Rey:
Runner-up (1): 1914

FC Barcelona
Catalan championship:
Champions (3): 1915–16, 1918–19 and 1919–20

Copa del Rey:
Runner-up (1): 1919

International
Catalonia
Prince of Asturias Cup:
Runner-up (1): 1915

References

1891 births
1977 deaths
Footballers from Barcelona
Spanish footballers
Association football defenders
FC Barcelona players
Catalonia international footballers